DSDS Kids was the only season of the kids version of Deutschland sucht den Superstar. Broadcaster RTL announced on 13 March 2012 that there will be a kids edition of DSDS for children between the ages of 4 and 14. Parents had up until 31 March 2012 to register their children. The first show was scheduled to start on 5 May 2012 at 20:15. Dieter Bohlen, Michelle Hunziker and Dana Schweiger were named to the jury and Daniel Aßmann served as the host.

In April 2013, RTL decided that DSDS Kids will not return for a second season. There were only four shows planned for the first season and no auditions were shown. The first three shows showed each step of the ten children who would eventually qualify for the finals. There were 38,664 applications for season 1 of the show.

Semi-finals

First semi-final
Original airdate: 5 May 2012
 
Voted through the final: Besnik, Timmy, Alysha
Eliminated: Gala, Samuel, Erisa, Pina, Skyla, Julius, Selina

Second semi-final
Original airdate: 11 May 2012
 
Voted through the final: Alina, Vanilla, Marco
Eliminated: Malcom, Nico, Laura, Michael-Chung, Hakan, Lisa-Marie, Noemi

Third semi-final
Original airdate: 18 May 2012
 
Voted through the final: Marcel, Shania, Yves
Eliminated: Gianni, Stefani, Latifa, Anita, Sinan, Verena, Jakob

Final
Original airdate: 25 May 2012
 
Winner: Marco
2nd to 10th place: Alysha, Yves, Shania, Gianni, Alina, Timmy, Besnik, Vanilla, Marcel

Elimination chart

 The judges decided the tenth contestant for the final as the "WildCard Contestant" and this person presented in the final week.

References

Kids
2012 in German music
2012 German television seasons